Eutrichiurides is an extinct genus of prehistoric cutlass fish.

Similar and related genera include the extant Aphanopus, Trichiurides and Trichiurus. These fishes lived in the Eocene period, from 55.8 to 48.6 mya.

Species
Species within this genus include:
 Eutrichiurides orpiensis  (Leriche, 1906) 
 Eutrichiurides goberti  (Casier, 1944) 
 Eutrichiurides termieri  (Arambourg) 
 Eutrichiurides delheidi  (Leriche, 1908)

Description
Eutrichiurides species were very similar in form and build to modern snake mackerels, in that they were long and slender, blade-shaped fishes with elongated jaws possessing fangs and needle-shaped teeth.

Distribution
Fossils of Eutrichiurides have been found the Eocene fossil sediments of India, Pakistan and the United Kingdom.

See also

 Prehistoric fish
 List of prehistoric bony fish

References 

Prehistoric perciform genera
Paleogene fish of Asia